Peltodoris murrea is a species of sea slug, a dorid nudibranch, shell-less marine gastropod mollusks in the family Discodorididae.

References
Notes

Sources
  Dayrat B. 2010. A monographic revision of discodorid sea slugs (Gastropoda, Opisthobranchia, Nudibranchia, Doridina). Proceedings of the California Academy of Sciences, Series 4, vol. 61, suppl. I, 1-403, 382 figs.

Discodorididae
Gastropods described in 1877